The 1948–49 Northern Football League season was the 51st in the history of the Northern Football League, a football competition in Northern England.

Clubs

The league featured 13 clubs which competed in the last season, along with one new club:
 Penrith

League table

References

1948-49
4